The 2002 All-Big 12 Conference football team consists of American football players chosen as All-Big 12 Conference players for the 2002 NCAA Division I-A football season.  The conference recognizes two official All-Big 12 selectors: (1) the Big 12 conference coaches selected separate offensive and defensive units and named first- and second-team players (the "Coaches" team); and (2) a panel of sports writers and broadcasters covering the Big 12 also selected offensive and defensive units and named first- and second-team players (the "Media" team).

Offensive selections

Quarterbacks
 Kliff Kingsbury, Texas Tech (Coaches-1; Media-1)
 Seneca Wallace, Iowa State (Coaches-2; Media-2)

Running backs
 Chris Brown, Colorado (Coaches-1; Media-1)
 Quentin Griffin, Oklahoma (Coaches-1; Media-1)
 Darren Sproles, Kansas State (Coaches-2; Media-2)
 Tatum Bell, Oklahoma State (Coaches-2)
 Cedric Benson, Texas (Media-2)

Centers
 Nick Leckey, Kansas State (Coaches-1; Media-1)
 Zach Butler, Iowa State (Media-2)
 A.J. Ricker, Missouri (Coaches-2)

Guards
 Derrick Dockery, Texas (Coaches-1; Media-1)
 Wayne Lucier, Colorado (Coaches-1; Media-1)
 Bob Montgomery, Iowa State (Coaches-2; Media-2)
 Rex Richards, Texas Tech (Media-2)
 Taylor Whitley, Texas A&M (Coaches-2)

Tackles
 Justin Bates, Colorado (Coaches-1; Media-1)
 Jammal Brown, Oklahoma (Coaches-2; Media-1)
 Rob Droege, Missouri (Coaches-1; Media-2)
 Thomas Barnett, Kansas State (Coaches-2; Media-2)

Tight ends
 Trent Smith, Oklahoma (Coaches-1; Media-1)
 Greg Porter, Texas A&M (Coaches-2; Media-2)

Receivers
 Rashaun Woods, Oklahoma State (Coaches-1; Media-1)
 Roy Williams, Texas (Coaches-1; Media-2)
 Justin Gage, Missouri (Coaches-2; Media-1)
 Reggie Newhouse, Baylor (Coaches-2; Media-2)
 Wes Welker, Texas Tech (Coaches-2)

Defensive selections

Defensive linemen
 Tommie Harris, Oklahoma (Coaches-1; Media-1)
 Cory Redding, Texas (Coaches-1; Media-1)
 Tank Reese, Kansas State (Coaches-1; Media-1)
 Kevin Williams, Oklahoma State (Coaches-1; Media-1)
 Jimmy Wilkerson, Oklahoma (Coaches-1; Media-2)
 Keith Wright, Missouri (Coaches-2; Media-2)
 Jordan Carstens, Iowa State (Coaches-2; Media-2)
 Andrew Shull, Kansas State (Media-2)
 Henry Bryant, Kansas State (Coaches-2)
 Ty Warren, Texas A&M, (Coaches-2)
 Tyler Brayton, Colorado (Coaches-2)

Linebackers
 Teddy Lehman, Oklahoma (Coaches-1; Media-1)
 Derrick Johnson, Texas (Coaches-1; Media-1)
 Terry Pierce, Kansas State (Coaches-2; Media-1)
 Lawrence Flugence, Texas Tech (Coaches-2; Media-1)
 Josh Buhl, Kansas State (Media-2)
 Lance Mitchell, Oklahoma (Media-2)
 Greg Cole, Kansas (Media-2)
 Jarrod Penright, Texas A&M (Media-2)

Defensive backs
 Terence Newman, Kansas State (Coaches-1; Media-1)
 Brandon Everage, Oklahoma (Coaches-1; Media-1)
 Derrick Strait, Oklahoma (Coaches-1; Media-1)
 Rod Babers, Texas (Coaches-1; Media-1)
 DeJuan Groce, Nebraska (Coaches-2; Media-2)
 Nathan Vasher, Texas (Coaches-2; Media-2)
 Andre Woolfolk, Oklahoma (Coaches-2; Media-2)
 Sammy Davis, Texas A&M (Coaches-2)
 Donald Strickland, Colorado (Media-2)

Special teams

Kickers
 Josh Brown, Nebraska (Coaches-1; Media-2)
 Adam Benike, Iowa State (Coaches-2; Media-1)

Punters
 Mark Mariscal, Colorado (Coaches-1; Media-1)
 Kyle Larson, Nebraska (Coaches-2)
 Cody Scates, Texas A&M (Media-2)

All-purpose / Return specialists
 DeJuan Groce, Nebraska (Coaches-1; Media-2)
 Wes Welker, Texas Tech (Coaches-2; Media-1)
 Terence Newman, Kansas State (Coaches-1)
 Antonio Perkins, Oklahoma (Coaches-2)

Key
Bold = selected as a first-team player by both the coaches and media panel

Coaches = selected by Big 12 Conference coaches

Media = selected by a media panel

See also
2002 College Football All-America Team

References

All-Big 12 Conference
All-Big 12 Conference football teams